Seminole is a city in Pinellas County, Florida, United States. The population was 19,364 at the 2020 census.

History
The first white settlement at Seminole was made in the 1840s. This community was named after the Seminole tribe whose descendants still inhabited the area. Seminole was incorporated in 1970.

Geography

Seminole is located at  (27.838502, –82.784913). It is surrounded by Pinellas County enclaves in all directions. Its closest neighbors are Indian Rocks Beach to the northwest, Largo to the north, Pinellas Park to the east, St. Petersburg to the south, and Madeira Beach to the west. Its main arteries are State Road 694 and Alternate U.S. Highway 19. It embraces the lower half of the lower limb of Lake Seminole.

Demographics

As of the 2020 census, there were 19,364 people and 8,648 households residing in the city. The racial makeup of the city was 90.2% White, 2.4% African American, 0.6% Native American, 3.3% Asian, 0.4% Pacific Islander, and 2.2% from two or more races. Hispanic or Latino of any race were 6.2% of the population.

There were 8,648 households, out of which 12.6% had children under the age of 18 living with them, 35.4% were married couples living together, 7.4% had a female householder with no husband present, and 54.9% were non-families. 49.1% of all households were made up of individuals, and 33.8% had someone living alone who was 65 years of age or older.  The average household size was 2.10.

In the city, the population was spread out, with 13.2% under the age of 18, 3.8% from 18 to 24, 19.5% from 25 to 44, 21.3% from 45 to 64, and 43.6% who were 65 years of age or older.  The median age was 59 years. For every 100 females, there were 76.2 males.  For every 100 females age 18 and over, there were 72.3 males.

The median income for a household in the city (in 2019 dollars) was $53,975. The per capita income for the city (in 2019 dollars) was $42,159.  

Males had a median income of $29,237 versus $25,588 for females. About 10.3% of the population were below the poverty line, including 5.7% of those under age 18 and 9.7% of those age 65 or over.

In 2010 the mean income for a household in the city was $45,730, and the median income for a family was $63,260.  The per capita income for the city was $29,862.

Recreation and library 

The City of Seminole has many park spaces for its community to get outside. Its four parks and recreation center area provide people of all ages space to relax and play. Overlooking a large pond with a variety of birds and other wildlife, Seminole City Park is located on the Pinellas Trail (with water and bathrooms) and has a large playground with several pavilions that can be rented. Many events (like the Music in the Park series) are held in its amphitheater area, and the Seminole Historical Society building sits adjacent. A second city park sits along the Pinellas Trail—Orange Blossom Park—which has a newly constructed large playground, trail, basketball court, and bathrooms. Tennis Club Park is as it sounds—full of tennis courts. The city's newest park is Waterfront Park, which held its playground ribbon-cutting in 2021 and features a waterfront boardwalk, canoe and kayak launch, walking trail, pavilions, bathrooms, and a playground.

Several Pinellas County parks are in the Seminole area including Lake Seminole Park, Boca Ciega Millennium Park, and Walsingham Park.

Originally founded in 1960, the Seminole Community Library operates as a joint use library campus in conjunction with St. Petersburg College. It is a member of the Pinellas Public Library Cooperative and provides materials, resources, services, and programs to the public.

Notable people

 Larry Bearnarth, professional baseball player, scout, and coach who was a resident of Seminole at the time of his death
 Angela Elwell Hunt, author
 Nicole Johnson, Miss America 1999
 Casey Kotchman, Major League Baseball player
 Brittany Lincicome, professional golfer, winner of the 2009 Kraft Nabisco Championship
 Brett Phillips, Major League Baseball player
 Randy Savage, pro wrestler
 Bobby Wilson, Major League Baseball player

Gallery

References

External links

City of Seminole official website

Cities in Pinellas County, Florida
Cities in Florida
Populated places on the Intracoastal Waterway in Florida